Eamonn Edward Francis Kinsella (8 October 1932 – 8 August 1991), was an Irish track and field athlete who specialized in the hurdles. He competed in the 110 metres hurdles event in the 1956 Melbourne Olympics, failing to progress beyond the heats. He was born in Carlow and died in Dublin.

References
Eamonn Kinsella. Sports Reference. Retrieved on 2015-03-26.
Official Olympic Reports
International Olympic Committee results database

1932 births
1991 deaths
Irish male hurdlers
Sportspeople from County Carlow
Sportspeople from Dublin (city)
Olympic athletes of Ireland
Athletes (track and field) at the 1956 Summer Olympics